Ahmad Chhadeh  (born 16 October 1992) is a Lebanese music producer 
 and a social media expert. He is also the founder and CEO of Arabsong Production. He won many awards.

Life and career 
At an early age, Chhadeh founded his own company Arabsong Production  where he dealt with well-known artists such as  Sherine, Marwan Khoury,  Adam,  Muhammad El Majzoub, Jad Ezzddine, Rola Kadri, Jad Khalife  and many others.
In 2012, Chhadeh began his career as a singer after he released more than one song, including one for the Lebanese football team, after being on the verge of qualifying for the FIFA World.
In 2013, Chhadeh entered the world of management  and web - pages, and he was able to discover many policy gaps and technological deficiencies in social media sites such as WhatsApp and Instagram. 
In 2021, Chhadeh has awarded the Best Social Media Expert and E-Commerce Awards  by Beirut Golden Award during the Nations Festival Day. He also won the Best Young Entrepreneur Award for 2021 by Beirut Golden Award during Miss Humanity Beauty Contest.

Awards 
Winner of the Best Social Media Expert 2021  
Winner of E-Commerce Award 2021 
Winner of  the Best Young Entrepreneur Award for 2021

References

Lebanese businesspeople
Lebanese musicians
1992 births
Living people
People from Tyre District